Prionomelia spododea is a species of geometrid moth in the family Geometridae. It is found in North America.

The MONA or Hodges number for Prionomelia spododea is 6613.

References

Further reading

 

Boarmiini
Articles created by Qbugbot
Moths described in 1896